Angelina Iosifovna Stepanova (23 November 1905 – 17 May 2000) was a Soviet and Russian stage and film actress, teacher. She was winner of the Stalin Prize of  I class (1952) and USSR State Prize   (1977). People's Artist of the USSR (1960).

Biography
Stepanova was born on 23 November 1905  in Nikolayevsk (now Nikolayevsk-on-Amur, Khabarovsk Krai) in the family of an insurance agent and a dentist. Studying in a Moscow gymnasium, she was fond of ballet. Since 1921 she studied at the theater school at the Vakhtangov Theatre, which she graduated in 1924, from the same year she worked at the Moscow Art Theatre. She later became a professor at the Moscow Art Theatre School. 

Stepanova started her film career in 1932.

Death
She died on 17 May 2000 and was buried at the Novodevichy Cemetery.

Selected filmography
 The House of the Dead (1932) as female student
 The Unforgettable Year 1919 (1951) as Olga Butkevich
 Goodbye, Boys (1964) as Nadezhda Belova, Volodya's mother
 War and Peace (1965—1967) as Anna Pavlovna Scherer
 Day by Day (1972) as Sokolova
 The Flight of Mr. McKinley (1975) as Mrs. Ann Shamway
 They Fought for Their Country (1975) as old cossack woman
 Twenty Days Without War (1976) as Zinaida Antonovna
 A Declaration of Love (1977) as Zinochka in old age

References

External links 
 
 Эрдман. Переписка сo Степановой
 Vitaly Vulf. Ангелина Степанова. Большая роль.

1905 births
2000 deaths
People from Nikolayevsk-on-Amur
Soviet film actresses
Soviet stage actresses
Soviet television actresses
Heroes of Socialist Labour
Recipients of the Order "For Merit to the Fatherland", 3rd class
Recipients of the Order of Lenin
Recipients of the Order of Friendship of Peoples
People's Artists of the USSR
People's Artists of the RSFSR
Honored Artists of the RSFSR
Stalin Prize winners
Recipients of the USSR State Prize
Communist Party of the Soviet Union members
Academic staff of Moscow Art Theatre School
Burials at Novodevichy Cemetery